Neot Golan is an Israeli settlement and moshav, in the southern Golan Heights, under the administration of Israel.

The international community considers Israeli settlements in the Golan Heights illegal under international law, but the Israeli government disputes this.

History
The moshav was built in 1968, when Golan area was a part of the Israeli Military Governorate.

See also
Israeli-occupied territories

References

Israeli settlements in the Golan Heights
Golan Regional Council
Moshavim
Populated places in Northern District (Israel)
Populated places established in 1968
1968 establishments in the Israeli Military Governorate